Palazzolo is an Italian surname. Notable people with the surname include:

Jack Palazzolo, Australian association football player
Jim Palazzolo, American football coach
Luigi Maria Palazzolo (1827–1886), Italian Roman Catholic priest
Tom Palazzolo (born 1937), American filmmaker, photographer and artist
Vito Roberto Palazzolo (born 1947), Italian businessman

Italian-language surnames